Babubhai Jamnadas Patel, commonly referred to as Babubhai Patel, is a BJP politician and has been elected a member of Gujarat Legislative Assembly from Daskroi constituency in Ahmedabad district of Gujarat in 2007, 2012, 2017 and 2022 state assembly elections.

References

Living people
Bharatiya Janata Party politicians from Gujarat
Gujarat MLAs 2007–2012
Politicians from Ahmedabad
Gujarat MLAs 2012–2017
Gujarat MLAs 2017–2022
Year of birth missing (living people)